Ewha Law School is one of the professional graduate schools of Ewha Woman's University, located in Seoul, South Korea. Founded in 2009, it is one of the founding law schools in South Korea and is one of the larger schools with each class in the three-year J.D. program where only 100 female students are offered admission — male students are forbidden to enter this law school.

Programs
Ewha Law specializes on gender law.

References 

Ewha Womans University
Law schools in South Korea
Educational institutions established in 2009
2009 establishments in South Korea
ko:이화여자대학교 법학전문대학원